Range Justice is a 1949 American Western film directed by Ray Taylor and written by Ronald Davidson. The film stars Johnny Mack Brown, Max Terhune, Tris Coffin, Riley Hill, Sarah Padden and Eddie Parker. The film was released on July 16, 1949, by Monogram Pictures.

Plot

Cast           
Johnny Mack Brown as Johnny Mack Brown
Max Terhune as Alibi
Tris Coffin as Ed Dutton
Riley Hill as Glenn Hadley
Sarah Padden as Ma Curtis
Eddie Parker as Lacey
Fred Kohler Jr. as Stoner
Felice Ingersoll as Beth Hadley
Kenne Duncan as Kirk
Myron Healey as Dade
Bill Hale as Bud
Bill Potter as Bill

References

External links
 

1949 films
American Western (genre) films
1949 Western (genre) films
Monogram Pictures films
Films directed by Ray Taylor
American black-and-white films
1940s English-language films
1940s American films